Majorettes in Space is a French short film written and directed by David Fourier and released in 1996. It won the 1997 BAFTA Award for Best Short Film and the 1998 César Award for Best Short Film.

Summary 
Two male Russian cosmonauts, one of whom has a fetish for majorettes, are in space without condoms. A young heterosexual couple have sex outdoors. Pope John Paul II is passionate about airports but enforces the sexually restrictive teachings of the Catholic Church. Vincent, a young gay man, is dying of AIDS.

Cast 
 Elise Laurent: Catherine
 Jean-Marc Delacruz: Laurent
 Olivier Laville: Vincent
 Cléo Delacruz: Julie
 Aurélien Bianco: Arnaud

Nominations and awards 
Audience Award (National Competition) at the Clermont-Ferrand International Short Film Festival
1997: BAFTA Award for Best Short Film
1998: César Award for Best Short Film

References

External links 

 Des majorettes dans l'espace on Vimeo
 

1996 short films
1996 LGBT-related films
1996 films
César Award winners
Films about astronauts
Films about LGBT and Christianity
Films about Pope John Paul II
Films critical of the Catholic Church
French LGBT-related films
French short films
HIV/AIDS in French films
LGBT-related short films
1990s French films